Bhausaheb is a given name. Notable people with the name include:

Bhausaheb Phundkar, leader of opposition in Maharashtra Legislative Council in India
Bhausaheb Rajaram Wakchaure, member of the 15th Lok Sabha of India
Bhausaheb Ubale, (born 1936 in Bawchi, India), a Canadian human rights activist
Late Bhausaheb Hiray Smaranik Samiti Trust, Indian college
Shri Bhausaheb Hire Government Medical College, Dhule, Medical Institution located in Dhule, Maharashtra
Shri Bhausaheb Maharaj Umdikar, Indian guru, initiated the Inchegeri Sampraday
Bhausaheb Bandodkar, the first Chief Minister of Goa, Daman and Diu

References